Glorious Results of a Misspent Youth is the fourth studio album by Joan Jett and the third to feature her backing band The Blackhearts. The album was released in 1984 and reissued in 1998 with seven bonus tracks. The title of the album was taken from a line of dialogue in an episode of The Honeymooners.

MCA Records had trouble pulling a successful single from the album. They released two music videos for the songs "I Need Someone" and "I Love You Love Me Love" (its title shortened to "I Love You Love"), but only "I Love You Love" was released in the 7-inch format (backed with a live version of "Talkin' 'Bout My Baby"). In the UK, "I Need Someone" was released as a 12-inch single, but the vocal differed from the album version. "Cherry Bomb" was remixed by Mark S. Berry and released as a promotional 12-inch single in the US on red vinyl, coupled with an instrumental titled "Bombs Away". The record sleeve featured Jett firing up a large plastic cherry with a Bic lighter. "Hide and Seek" and "I Can't Control Myself" were produced by Thom Panunzio and Kenny Laguna. Both originally appeared on the Venezuelan release of the Glorious Results of a Misspent Youth album (which was titled I Need Someone for that country). "Bird Dog" was produced by Kenny Laguna. It originally appeared as the B-side of the British 12" single, "I Love You Love Me Love".

A live version of "Talkin' 'Bout My Baby" was produced by John Aiosa and Kenny Laguna and originally appeared as the B-side of "I Love You Love Me Love". It was recorded live at CBGB in New York City on October 11, 1984.

Track listing

Original release

Venezuelan edition (I Need Someone)
"Bomba De Cereza" (Cherry Bomb)
"Nueva Orleans" (New Orleans)
"Hablando Sobre Mi Bebe" (Talkin' 'Bout My Baby)
"Mucho Tiempo" (Long Time)
"Necesito Alguien" (I Need Someone)
"Frustrada" (Frustrated)
"Empuja Y Zapatea" (Push and Stomp)
"No Puedo Controlarme" (I Can't Control Myself)
"Amor Como El Mio" (Love Like Mine)
"Algun Dia" (Someday)
"Esconde Y Busca" (Hide and Seek)

Personnel

The Blackhearts
 Joan Jett – lead vocals, rhythm guitar
 Ricky Byrd – lead guitar, backing vocals
 Gary Ryan – bass, backing vocals
 Lee Crystal – drums, backing vocals

Additional musicians
The Uptown Horns:
Crispin Choe – baritone saxophone
Robert Funk – trombone
Arno Hecht – tenor saxophone
Paul Litteral – trumpet
The Ross Levinson Strings directed by Ross Levinson
Jack Baskow – saxophone
Gary U.S. Bonds – backing vocals on track 9

Production
Kenny Laguna – producer on all tracks
Ritchie Cordell – producer on tracks 2, 5-8, 10
Chris Kimsey – producer on track 11
Thom Panunzio – producer on tracks 1, 3, 4, 9, 12-14, 17, 19, engineer, mixing
Jimmy Iovine – producer on tracks 2, 4, 7, 12, production consultant
John Aiosa – producer on track 16
Shelly Yakus – engineer on tracks 2, 4, 7, 12
Jim Ball, John Devlin, Gray Russell – additional engineering
Tom Swift, Carol Cafiero, Bruce Lampcov – assistant engineers
Bob Ludwig – mastering at Masterdisk, New York

Album design – Spencer Drate and Judith Salavetz
Art direction – Meryl Laguna

Charts

References

Joan Jett albums
1984 albums
Albums produced by Jimmy Iovine
Blackheart Records albums
Epic Records albums
Columbia Records albums
Albums produced by Thom Panunzio